William Waugh (born 20 January 1973) is a British former field hockey player who competed in the 2000 Summer Olympics.

Waugh played his first international match in New Delhi, India, on 4 February 1995 against Kazakhstan, losing 0-1, and over the course of his career amassed a total of 121 caps for England and 15 caps for Great Britain. He also captained England at all levels, with the highlight being his captainship of the England team in the Commonwealth Games in Kuala Lumpur in 1998, where England won a Bronze Medal.

Waugh announced his retirement from international hockey in 2002.

References

External links

 

1973 births
Living people
British male field hockey players
Olympic field hockey players of Great Britain
Field hockey players at the 2000 Summer Olympics
Commonwealth Games medallists in field hockey
Commonwealth Games bronze medallists for England
1998 Men's Hockey World Cup players
2002 Men's Hockey World Cup players
Field hockey players at the 1998 Commonwealth Games
Medallists at the 1998 Commonwealth Games